Konoha (kanji: 木ノ葉; (tree's) leaves in Japanese) is a name that can refer to:
Konoha Edajima, a character from Onegai Teacher
Konoha Suetsugi, blondish-hair with black hairband on the top as a beauty idol, from Mikakunin de Shinkoukei
Konoha, character from the multimedia series: Kagerou Project
Konoha (Konohagakure or The Village hidden in the leaves), a ninja village from anime series Naruto